Carlo von Tiedemann (born 20 October 1943, in Stargard, Pommern) is a German television presenter.

Life 
Since 1971 Tiedemann has worked as a television and radio presenter for German broadcaster NDR. From 1980 to 1988 Tiedemann was married for the first time. Tiedemann has been in his second marriage since 2012. He has four children. Tiedemann lives in Quickborn and Hamburg.

Television

 Aktuelle Schaubude (1977–1988, 1997–2004)
 Show & Co. mit Carlo
 Lachen macht Spaß
 Eurotops
 Deutscher Musikladen
 Große Hafenrundfahrt
 Große Show für kleine Leute (ZDF, 1984)
 DAS!
 Tipps für das Wochenende: Was ist los in Hamburg?
 Lachen mit ...
 Große Freiheit
 NDR 90,3 Fofteihn
 NDR 90,3 Zur Sache
 NDR2 – Der heisse Draht
 NDR2 – Von neun bis halb eins
 NDR2 – Am Vormittag
 NDR-Talkshow
 NDR-Quizshow

Literature 
 So. Und nicht anders. Mein aufregendes Leben, by Jens Meyer-Odewald, Verlag Die Hanse, Hamburg 2005, .

German game show hosts
German television talk show hosts
1943 births
Living people
People from Stargard
People from the Province of Pomerania
Norddeutscher Rundfunk people
Recipients of the Medal of the Order of Merit of the Federal Republic of Germany